Léon Dupont (18 May 1881 – 4 October 1956) was a Belgian athlete who mainly competed in the standing high jump. He competed for Belgium in the 1906 Intercalated Games held in Athens, Greece in the standing high jump where he won the silver medal jointly with American pair Lawson Robertson and Martin Sheridan and behind American superstar Ray Ewry.

References

External links
 

1881 births
1956 deaths
Belgian male high jumpers
Olympic athletes of Belgium
Olympic silver medalists for Belgium
Medalists at the 1906 Intercalated Games
Athletes (track and field) at the 1906 Intercalated Games
Athletes (track and field) at the 1908 Summer Olympics
Olympic male high jumpers